Peach Kelli Pop III  is the third album by the Canadian/American Rock band Peach Kelli Pop, released in 2015 on Burger Records.

Track listing

Production
Recorded by Joel Jerome at ARW studio 12/14
Mike Lavin  – mastering 
Kenneth Maclaurin  – album design
Abby Banks  – cover photo
Eva Barron  – insert photo
Alyssa Lswolsky  – additional photoshopping

References

1. http://peachkellipop.com/collections/music/products/peach-kelli-pop-iii

2015 albums